Rudolph Ludewyk "Okey" Lewis (12 July 1887 – 29 October 1933) was a South African road racing cyclist who won the gold medal in the road race at the 1912 Summer Olympics.

Lewis was born on a farm near Pretoria and grew up in Germiston. He worked full-time underground at a gold mine, and in spare time trained in cycling, boxing and skating. After the 1912 Olympics he raced professionally in Germany in 1913–14, and won the classic race Rund um Dresden in 1914. During World War I, he served in the German Army and was awarded the Iron Cross. His health deteriorated as a result of war injuries and time spent in a prison camp, which resulted in his early death at age 46.

Major results 

1912
 Summer Olympics Time Trial – gold medal
1913
 Rund um Dresden, – 2nd place
1914
 Rund um Dresden – 1st place
 Großer Sachsenpreis – 2nd place

References

External links
 profile

1887 births
1933 deaths
Sportspeople from Pretoria
South African Republic people
South African male cyclists
Cyclists at the 1912 Summer Olympics
Olympic cyclists of South Africa
Olympic gold medalists for South Africa
Olympic medalists in cycling
Medalists at the 1912 Summer Olympics
Recipients of the Iron Cross (1914)